Robert Duane Hillis (born November 21, 1970) is an American model and actor. He is best known for playing Hamilton ("Hamm") in the film Sharktopus vs. Pteraconda.

Early life and career
Robert Duane Hillis was born in Suffern, New York, and grew up in Newton, Massachusetts with his parents, two sisters and brother. Hillis graduated from Newton South High School. He adopted his nickname "Rib" while in the third grade playing with frogs, and enjoyed the sounds that they make.

Hillis married a woman four days after their first date but separated in 2008. They have twins. On August 17, 2012, he married ballroom dancer, world champion and former Dancing with the Stars pro, Elena Grinenko; they have since divorced.  Hillis is currently engaged to fellow actor Jessica Morris.

Modeling
During his junior year at the University of Colorado in Boulder, he was discovered by a modeling agent. Since college, he has worked in Milan, Paris, Barcelona, London, Sydney, New York, Miami, and Los Angeles for such publications as Uomo Vogue, GQ, Esquire, and Men's Health, as well as national and international commercials. In addition, he landed various print campaigns for Versace, Armani and Catalyst Cologne.

He appeared in season 4 of America's Next Top Model in 2005 as a lingerie model in the episode "The Girl Who Pushes Tyra Over the Edge".

Acting
Returning to the United States in spring of 1996, Hillis moved to Los Angeles and landed a role on an episode of Baywatch Nights as Jeds.

His most notable role as an actor came on General Hospital spin-off Port Charles as Dr. Jake Marshak. He was on the show from 1997 to 1998. In May 2006, he substituted for Eric Martsolf as Ethan Winthrop on Passions when Martsolf took paternity leave for his newborn twin sons. Moreover, he has appeared in dozens of television shows such as Ugly Betty, Two and a Half Men, CSI and CSI: Miami. He also has a starring role in the feature film Propiedad Ajena.

Hillis played the leading role in the Syfy feature film Piranhaconda in 2012.
He played Val Walker in Cowboys vs Dinosaurs in 2012.

Reality television
Hillis has done two home improvement/building shows, Model Citizen and Get a Grip.

In the fall 2007 TV season, Hillis joined the design team on ABC's Extreme Makeover: Home Edition.

Filmography

Film

Television

Web

References

External links
 
 

1971 births
20th-century American male actors
21st-century American male actors
American male film actors
American male soap opera actors
American male television actors
Living people
Male actors from New York (state)
Male models from New York (state)
People from Suffern, New York